Rafał Grzelak (born 7 August 1988) is a Polish footballer who plays as a left-back or centre-back for Wigry Suwałki.

Career

Club
Born in Mława, Grzelak was released from Wisła Płock on 30 June 2011.

In July 2011, he joined Dolcan Ząbki.
He signed a two-year contract with Scottish Premiership club Heart of Midlothian in June 2017.

On 13 August 2020, he returned to Korona Kielce.

Career statistics

References

External links
 

1988 births
Living people
Polish footballers
Ząbkovia Ząbki players
Wisła Płock players
Ekstraklasa players
I liga players
II liga players
Podbeskidzie Bielsko-Biała players
Korona Kielce players
Zagłębie Sosnowiec players
Wigry Suwałki players
People from Mława
Sportspeople from Masovian Voivodeship
Association football midfielders
Heart of Midlothian F.C. players
Polish expatriate footballers
Expatriate footballers in Scotland
Polish expatriate sportspeople in Scotland
Scottish Professional Football League players